Qareh Qoli (also Romanized as Qareh Qolī; also known as Kalāteh-ye Qanbar Qarāqolī) is a village in Robat Rural District, in the Central District of Sabzevar County, Razavi Khorasan Province, Iran. At the 2006 census, its population was 798, in 202 families.

References 

Populated places in Sabzevar County